Alukah (Hebrew: עֲלוּקָה ‘ălūqāh) is a feminine Hebrew word that means "horse-leech", a type of leech with many teeth that feeds on the throats of animals. According to biblical scholars, alukah can mean "blood-lusting monster" or vampire. Alukah is first referred to in Proverbs 30 of the Bible (Prov. 30:15).

The most detailed description of the alukah appears in Sefer Chasidim, where the creature is understood to be a living human being, but can shape-change into a wolf. It can fly (by releasing its long hair) and would eventually die if prevented from feeding on blood for a long enough time. Once dead, a vampire can be prevented from becoming a demon by being buried with its mouth stuffed with earth.

Solomon refers to a female demon named "Alukah" in a riddle that he tells in Proverbs . The riddle involves Alukah's ability to curse a womb bearing seed. Historically, Alukah has been closely associated with Lilith or thought to be her direct descendant. The name Alukah may, additionally, merely be another title for Lilith. 

R. E. L. Masters describes the 'Alukah as "a Hebrew succubus and vampire derived from Babylonian demonology."

References 

Jewish legendary creatures
Book of Proverbs
Demons in Judaism
Vampires